Old Growth (New/Now) is a large scale exterior public art installation by architect and artist Alison Wright. It is located opposite to the Culver City Metro Station.

Electric poles and cross arms support 56 pieces of glass. Historic images from the archives of Southern California Edison and the Culver City Historical Society are placed on one side of the glass. The glass panels on the other side form a Douglas Fir tree, a type of tree that wood utility poles originated from. Unlike typical utility poles, these 40’ tall poles are not connected by power lines.  The glass panels are backlit by solar energy via solar panels.

References

Further reading

American contemporary art
Outdoor sculptures in California
2017 sculptures
Art in California
Art in Greater Los Angeles
Culture of Los Angeles
Installation art works
Buildings and structures in Culver City, California